D405 branches off to the southwest from D8 near Jablanac towards Stinica ferry port - ferry access to Mišnjak, island of Rab (D105). The road is 4.8 km long.

The road, as well as all other state roads in Croatia, is managed and maintained by Hrvatske ceste, state owned company.

Traffic volume 

Traffic is not regularly counted on the road, however, Hrvatske ceste report number of vehicles using Jablanac-Mišnjak ferry line, connecting D405 to the D105 state road. Substantial variations between annual (AADT) and summer (ASDT) traffic volumes are attributed to the fact that the road connects to a number of summer resorts.

Road junctions and populated areas

Sources

External links
 Rapska Plovidba
 About ferry line Stinica (land) - Misnjak (island Rab)

State roads in Croatia
Lika-Senj County